Bledsoe County is a county located in the U.S. state of Tennessee. As of the 2020 census, the population was 14,913. Its county seat is Pikeville.

History
Bledsoe County was formed in 1807 from land that was formerly Indian Land as well as land carved from Roane County. The county was named for Anthony Bledsoe (1739–1788), a soldier in the Revolutionary War and was an early settler of Sumner County. He was killed in an Indian attack at Bledsoe's Station.

Like many East Tennessee counties, Bledsoe County opposed secession on the eve of the Civil War. In Tennessee's Ordinance of Secession on June 8, 1861, the county's residents voted against secession by a margin of 500 to 197.  General James G. Spears, a resident of Bledsoe, served as a vice president at the pro-Union East Tennessee Convention in May and June 1861, and fought for the Union Army in the war.

Geography

Adjacent counties
 Cumberland County (north)
 Rhea County (east/EST Border)
 Hamilton County (southeast/EST Border)
 Sequatchie County (southwest)
 Van Buren County (west)

State protected areas
 Bledsoe State Forest (part)
 Fall Creek Falls State Natural Area (part)
 Fall Creek Falls State Park (part)

Demographics

2020 census

As of the 2020 United States census, there were 14,913 people, 4,894 households, and 3,473 families residing in the county.

2000 census
As of the census of 2000, there were 12,367 people, 4,430 households, and 3,313 families residing in the county.  The population density was 30 people per square mile (12/km2).  There were 5,142 housing units at an average density of 13 per square mile (5/km2).  The racial makeup of the county was 94.44% White, 3.70% Black or African American, 0.38% Native American, 0.11% Asian, 0.02% Pacific Islander, 0.19% from other races, and 1.15% from two or more races.  1.12% of the population were Hispanic or Latino of any race.

There were 4,430 households, out of which 31.30% had children under the age of 18 living with them, 61.50% were married couples living together, 9.10% had a female householder with no husband present, and 25.20% were non-families. 22.10% of all households were made up of individuals, and 9.20% had someone living alone who was 65 years of age or older.  The average household size was 2.53 and the average family size was 2.94.

In the county, the population was spread out, with 23.10% under the age of 18, 8.40% from 18 to 24, 31.30% from 25 to 44, 25.80% from 45 to 64, and 11.40% who were 65 years of age or older.  The median age was 37 years. For every 100 females there were 121.00 males.  For every 100 females age 18 and over, there were 121.30 males.

The median income for a household in the county was $28,982, and the median income for a family was $34,593. Males had a median income of $26,648 versus $20,639 for females. The per capita income for the county was $13,889.  About 14.90% of families and 18.10% of the population were below the poverty line, including 21.00% of those under age 18 and 23.20% of those age 65 or over.

Recreation
Bledsoe County is home to a portion of Fall Creek Falls State Resort Park.

Prisons
Bledsoe County Correctional Complex (BCCX) covers about 2,500 acres between Pikeville and Spencer.  The prison is a level 3 facility which houses about 2,539 offenders in three separate facilities:  Site 1; Site 2 (formerly Southeast Tennessee State Regional Correctional Facility); and Unit 28 (houses female offenders.)

Communities

City

 Pikeville (county seat)

Unincorporated communities

 Cold Spring
 Dill
 Lees Station
 Lusk
 Melvine
 Mount Crest
 New Harmony
 Pailo
 Summer City
 Tiptop, Tennessee

Politics
Bledsoe County has long been a Republican stronghold, although it was not historically as Republican as the counties to its northeast. The last Democrat to carry this county was Bill Clinton in 1992. In 1988, it was one of two counties that didn't vote for Democratic Senator Jim Sasser, but two years later, it backed Governor Ned McWherter.

See also
 National Register of Historic Places listings in Bledsoe County, Tennessee
 USS Bledsoe County (LST-356)

References

External links

 Bledsoe County Chamber of Commerce
 TNGenweb
 Blesoe County – genealogical resources
 

 
1807 establishments in Tennessee
Populated places established in 1807
East Tennessee
Counties of Appalachia